David Madison Cawthorn (born August 1, 1995) is an American politician who served as the U.S. representative for North Carolina's 11th congressional district from 2021 to 2023. Cawthorn became the first member of Congress born in the 1990s and describes himself as a Christian and a constitutional conservative. He is a member of the Republican Party.

After working as a staffer for U.S. Representative Mark Meadows, Cawthorn was elected to succeed Meadows in 2020. His tenure was marked by various controversies, including allegations of insider trading, improper payments, bringing a handgun to an airport, and appearing in a leaked nude video. Cawthorn lost his reelection bid in the 2022 Republican primary to Chuck Edwards.

Early life and education 
Cawthorn was born on August 1, 1995, in Asheville, North Carolina, to Priscilla and Roger Cawthorn. He was home-schooled in Hendersonville, North Carolina, through 12th grade, and played football with the Asheville Saints, a league that includes home-schooled high school students. As a teenager, he worked at a Chick-fil-A restaurant.

In 2014, at age 18, Cawthorn was seriously injured while returning from a spring break trip to Florida. He was riding as a passenger in a BMW X3 SUV near Daytona Beach, Florida, when his friend Bradley Ledford fell asleep at the wheel. The vehicle crashed into a concrete barrier while Cawthorn's feet were on the dashboard. In a 2017 speech, he said that Ledford left him "to die in a fiery tomb", which Ledford has disputed. Ledford said in a sworn deposition for insurance litigation that he pulled an unconscious Cawthorn from the wrecked vehicle immediately after getting out himself; in Cawthorn's deposition, he stated that he had "no memory from the accident". In the same 2017 speech, Cawthorn stated that he was "declared dead on the scene" of the accident, but the official accident report listed him as "incapacitated". The injuries from the accident left Cawthorn partially paralyzed, requiring the use of a wheelchair. He said he accrued $3 million in medical debt during his recovery; he received that amount as settlement from an insurance company, as well as other payments, and as of February 2021 was seeking $30 million more.

Rep. Meadows had nominated Cawthorn to the United States Naval Academy in December 2013, but his application was rejected. Although this happened before his injury, he claimed in advertisements for his 2020 congressional campaign that the accident "derailed" his plans to attend the Academy. Cawthorn had acknowledged in 2017 under oath that he had been turned down before the accident. When asked about the discrepancy, he said, "I never said I was appointed or accepted to the academy, I knew that I'd only been nominated at that point. I fully expected to be accepted and to be appointed, but at that point I hadn't received it." 

During the fall 2016 semester, Cawthorn attended Patrick Henry College, studying political science, but earned mostly D grades and dropped out. He said his grades were low primarily because his injuries had interfered with his ability to learn. Cawthorn said in a deposition, "You know, suffering from a brain injury after the accident definitely I think it slowed my brain down a little bit. Made me less intelligent. And the pain also made reading and studying very difficult." He also said he withdrew due to "heartbreak" after his fiancée broke up with him.

Early career 
From January 2015 to August 2016, Cawthorn worked as a staff assistant in U.S. Representative Mark Meadows's district office. He told the Asheville Citizen-Times he worked there "full-time", but it was a part-time position.

Cawthorn is the owner and CEO of SPQR Holdings, LLC, a real estate investment firm in Hendersonville. The firm was started in August 2019 and reported no income; Cawthorn is its sole employee. As of August 2020, the company had been involved in only one real estate transaction, purchasing a 6-acre property for $20,000, in a foreclosure auction.

U.S. House of Representatives

Elections

2020

In the March 2020 Republican primary for North Carolina's 11th congressional district, Cawthorn finished second behind Lynda Bennett, who had been endorsed both by President Donald Trump and Meadows, who had become White House Chief of Staff. But Bennett did not receive the required 30% of the vote to avoid a runoff and Cawthorn won the June runoff overwhelmingly. He was supported by many local leaders and endorsed by Mark Walker, the vice chairman of the House Republican Conference. His victory has been called an upset. Cawthorn benefited from false and misleading claims that Bennett was a "Never-Trumper".

In a July 2020 event at the Texas border, Cawthorn declared, without evidence, that there was "a large group of cartels, kidnapping our American children and then taking them to sell them on a slave market, a sex slave market".

During the 2020 general campaign, a 2017 Cawthorn Instagram post with a picture of his visit to Adolf Hitler's vacation residence Eagle's Nest, which he said had been on his "bucket list for a while", generated criticism and allegations of far-right sympathies. He had referred to Hitler as "the Führer", Hitler's official title, and also called Hitler "a supreme evil". In response, Cawthorn denied being a white supremacist, calling the allegations ridiculous, and said he "completely and wholeheartedly denounce[s] any kind of white nationalism, any kind of Nazism". The Anti-Defamation League's analyst Mark Pitcavage said he did not see much merit in the accusations against Cawthorn. Some Jewish residents of his congressional district expressed concern about the incident, including Esther Manheimer, mayor of Asheville, the district's largest city. Cawthorn deleted the Instagram post on August 10.

Cawthorn spoke on the third day of the 2020 Republican National Convention. During his election bid, Cawthorn's campaign created a website to criticize journalist Tom Fiedler, who had produced investigative pieces on Cawthorn and had written favorably about his opponent. The website accused Fiedler of leaving academia "to work for non-white males, like Cory Booker, who aims to ruin white males running for office." The sentence on the website was later modified to claim Fiedler is "an unapologetic defender of left-wing identity politics". Cawthorn released a statement saying he had intended "to condemn" such political opinion as being "dangerous and divisive" and said that he "condemned racism and identity politics throughout [his] campaign." Ben Mathis-Lilley, writing for Slate, observed that Cawthorn's apology "convolutedly expressed regret for 'having unfairly implied I was criticizing Cory Booker,' which is notable in that it is not an apology for attacking the journalist in question, Tom Fiedler, as a traitor to his race."

In the November general election, Cawthorn defeated Democratic nominee Moe Davis. He took office on January 3, 2021. Upon hearing he had won, he tweeted, "cry more, lib".

Cawthorn is the youngest Republican and one of the youngest members ever elected to the House of Representatives. He is also the first member of Congress born in the 1990s.

2022

In November 2021, Cawthorn first declared his intention to run for a second term in the new 13th congressional district, which includes Cleveland County and other counties west of Charlotte. Cawthorn was registered to vote in the new 14th district; members of Congress are not required to live in the district they represent but merely in the same state. He wrote on Twitter that he was running in the 13th district because otherwise "another establishment, go-along-to-get-along Republican would prevail there." According to the Asheville Citizen-Times, opposition to Cawthorn in his current district, including by former supporters, "appears to provide a political rationale" for his decision.

Cawthorn later filed to run again in the 11th district, after new maps were approved in February.

On May 17, 2022, Cawthorn conceded to Republican primary challenger Chuck Edwards. Edwards had been supported by Senator Thom Tillis and most of the North Carolina General Assembly. Railing against "the cowardly and weak members of our own party", Cawthorn wrote, "It's time for the rise of the new right, it's time for Dark MAGA to truly take command." "Dark MAGA" references a fringe movement advocating a vengeful return of Trumpism.

14th Amendment challenge
In January 2022, a group of North Carolina voters formally challenged Cawthorn's qualifications to run again, "citing his participation in a rally last January in Washington that questioned the presidential election outcome and preceded the Capitol riot." The challenge is based on the third section of the Fourteenth Amendment, which prohibits anyone who has "engaged in insurrection or rebellion" against the U.S. government from holding public office. Under North Carolina law, the burden is on Cawthorn to show through a preponderance of the evidence that he is not an insurrectionist. The challenge was on hold while redistricting litigation continued.

Cawthorn filed suit in U.S. court to dismiss the challenge before the state elections board could hear it. The North Carolina attorney general's office, citing a 1919 application of the amendment to a congressman who had violated the Espionage Act, argued that the Fourteenth Amendment could apply to Cawthorn "if a state board determines he aided or encouraged the Jan. 6, 2021, attack on the Capitol." In March 2022, Judge Richard Myers ruled in Cawthorn's favor based on an 1872 law that gave amnesty to Civil War insurrectionists, but on May 24, 2022, an appeals court ruled that this law applied only to people who committed "constitutionally wrongful acts" before 1872. The appeals court did not determine whether Cawthorn is eligible for office; it only determined that the 1872 law does not shield him.

Tenure 
During his candidacy and time in Congress, Cawthorn has been known for incendiary rhetoric and promulgating conspiracy theories. He had said he intended to use his position to be a messenger rather than a legislator, writing to his colleagues, "I have built my staff around comms rather than legislation." Cawthorn subsequently closed all but one district office.

2020 
In December 2020, at a Turning Point USA conference in Florida, Cawthorn said that he would try to contest the 2020 presidential election results when Congress counted the Electoral College votes in January, citing fraud, though there was no evidence that fraud affected the election results. He subsequently used conspiracy theories about fraud to run advertisements and raise money for himself. He called on the TPUSA event's attendees to "lightly threaten" their representatives.

2021 
Cawthorn took his seat as a member of Congress at the start of the 117th Congress on January 3, 2021.

Before Trump supporters stormed the United States Capitol on January 6, Cawthorn addressed the crowd and said, "this crowd has some fight." He voted not to certify the Electoral College results in Congress and called Republicans who voted to certify the results "spineless cowards". He repeated the false conspiracy theories that there was widespread fraud in the election. After the riots, Cawthorn denounced the violence and said, "The party as a whole should have been much more wise about their choice of words." He later attempted to blame the riots on a "Democratic machine" of "agitators strategically placed inside of this group", amid intensifying calls for his resignation for his part in stoking the riots.

On January 20, the day of Joe Biden's inauguration, Cawthorn was one of 17 newly elected House Republicans to sign a letter congratulating him and expressing hope of bipartisan cooperation. On January 22, 2021, the government watchdog group Campaign for Accountability asked the Office of Congressional Ethics to investigate Cawthorn's role in the January 6 Capitol riot.

On January 23, on CNN Newsroom, Pamela Brown asked Cawthorn about his views of the election results, to which Cawthorn eventually responded that there was no voter fraud. He said, "You know, the Constitution allowed for us to be able to push back as much as we could and I did that to the amount of the constitutional limits that I had at my disposal. So now I would say that Joseph R. Biden is our president". According to Time, Cawthorn was "trying to have it both ways. One day, he's preaching about respecting the office of the Presidency and vowing to work across the aisle with Democratic colleagues. The next, he's trumpeting dangerous conspiracies to right-wing crowds and commentators."

In late February 2021, Cawthorn and a dozen other Republican House members skipped votes and enlisted others to vote for them, citing the ongoing COVID-19 pandemic. But he and the other members were actually attending the Conservative Political Action Conference, which was held at the same time as their absences. In response, the Campaign for Accountability, an ethics watchdog group, filed a complaint with the House Committee on Ethics and requested an investigation into Cawthorn and the other lawmakers. In July 2021, another ethics complaint was filed against Cawthorn by an aide to Representative David McKinley after Cawthorn first scolded a McKinley aide and later got into a shouting match with McKinley over being listed as a co-sponsor of McKinley's bill.

At an August 2021 Republican Party event in Macon County, Cawthorn said: "if our election systems continue to be rigged and continue to be stolen, then it's going to lead to one place—and it's bloodshed." He then said, "as much as I am willing to defend our liberty at all costs, there is nothing that I would dread doing more than having to pick up arms against a fellow American", with the only way to prevent that being "election security".

In October 2021, Cawthorn said, "our culture today is trying to completely de-masculate  all of the young men", because "they don't want people who are going to stand up". He issued a call to mothers, who he said are the "most vicious" conservatives: "If you are raising a young man, please raise them to be a monster". In November 2021, Cawthorn accused politicians of "trying to make everyone genderless, sexless, and just absolutely Godless", and declared that Americans "want our culture back, and if you want to stand in the way of that, we will run you over."

Cawthorn reacted to the not guilty verdict in the trial of Kyle Rittenhouse by offering Rittenhouse an internship, saying, "You have a right to defend yourself, so be armed, be dangerous and be moral".

2022 
During the 2022 Russian invasion of Ukraine, Cawthorn called Ukrainian president Volodymyr Zelenskyy a "thug" and said "the Ukrainian government is incredibly corrupt and is incredibly evil and has been pushing woke ideologies." Cawthorn wrote on Twitter that his comments were based on Zelenskyy's having allegedly spread misinformation directed at Americans. Alyssa Farah Griffin, for whom Cawthorn once interned, condemned his comments as based on ignorance and spreading Russian propaganda.

In a March 2022 interview, Cawthorn talked about "the sexual perversion that goes on in Washington" and said he had been invited to an orgy by an unnamed lawmaker. He also claimed that prominent Washington figures had used cocaine in front of him. In a closed-door meeting, multiple House Republicans complained about his comments. Members of the Freedom Caucus considered ejecting Cawthorn from its membership. House Minority Leader Kevin McCarthy and Minority Whip Steve Scalise then met with Cawthorn. McCarthy later told reporters that Cawthorn had admitted his claims were exaggerated or untrue: "He changes what he tells and that's not becoming of a congressman. He did not tell the truth [and] that's unacceptable." McCarthy said he had told Cawthorn that "He's lost my trust. He's going to have to earn it back."

In April 2022, American Muckrakers PAC requested an ethics investigation of Cawthorn's relationship with his aide Stephen Smith, Cawthorn's second cousin. The request said that Cawthorn had provided more than $250 worth of free housing and travel to Smith, in violation of House rules, providing documents that appear to show Smith lives for free in a house owned by Cawthorn. The complaint also alleges that the two may have an inappropriate personal relationship, possibly sexual in nature, something prohibited between a lawmaker and a member of their staff.

In May 2022, The Daily Beast reported that Blake Harp, Cawthorn's chief of staff, who was paid $131,278 in that position in 2021, also received $73,237 in that year from Cawthorn's campaign, despite House ethics rules that limit senior staff to earning $29,595 in outside income each year. Harp has also received payments from the campaign committee of Harp's mother, who ran unsuccessfully for Congress. Harp was Cawthorn's campaign manager in 2020, becoming chief of staff in 2021.

On May 17, 2022, Cawthorn lost renomination to Chuck Edwards, a state senator. Edwards went on to win the general election.

On November 16, 2022, Joel Burgess of the Asheville Citizen-Times wrote Cawthorn had vacated and shut down his offices two months before the end of his term. He subsequently purchased a $1.1 million dollar home in Florida. Responding to the news that constituent services calls were not being handled, Edwards invited people to contact his state senate office instead.

Political positions
During his 2020 campaign, Cawthorn said that he would "like to be the face of the Republican Party when it comes to health care."

Cawthorn identifies as a constitutional conservative and describes his position on abortion rights as pro-life or anti-abortion. In 2021, he joined the House Freedom Caucus, a caucus of conservative House Republicans. He describes himself as "fiscally conservative", says his stance on immigration is "conservative", and supports legal gun ownership, opposing gun control legislation.

Cawthorn supports legal same-sex marriage, but opposes gender transition treatments for minors. He also supports removing Confederate statues because they commemorate secession from the United States, though in June 2021 he voted against a bill that would remove statues of white supremacists and Confederates from the United States Capitol. In 2022, Cawthorn voted against the Respect for Marriage Act, legislation to codify same-sex marriage into federal law.

Cawthorn has said that climate change is "pretty minimal".

Cawthorn falsely asserts that the 2020 presidential election was fraudulent, though he backtracked on the claim during a January 2021 CNN interview with Pamela Brown.

Committee assignments 
 House Committee on Education and Labor
 House Committee on Veterans' Affairs

Caucus memberships 
 Republican Study Committee
 Freedom Caucus

Personal life

Cawthorn describes himself as a Christian. He has an older brother named Zachary.

Cawthorn married Cristina Bayardelle, a college student and competitive CrossFit athlete, in a December 2020 civil ceremony, followed by an April 2021 outdoor ceremony. In December 2021, Cawthorn announced they were getting divorced.

Cawthorn said that he trained in wheelchair racing for the 2020 Summer Paralympics, but never competed at a qualifying level and was not involved in a team.

Sexual misconduct allegations 
In August 2020, during Cawthorn's campaign for Congress, several women accused him of sexually aggressive behavior, sexual misconduct, and sexual assault.

Katrina Krulikas described an incident when she was 17 and Cawthorn was 19 in which he pressured her to sit on his lap and attempted to kiss her forcibly twice, which she resisted. Cawthorn did not deny the allegations, but said, "I did try and kiss her, just very normal, just in a flirtatious way", adding, "If I did make her feel unsafe, I feel bad", but questioned the timing of her allegation. His campaign characterized Krulikas's allegations as politically motivated, which she denied.

After Krulikas made her allegations, three other women made allegations of sexual misconduct against Cawthorn, including forcible grabbing and kissing. One woman said Cawthorn called her "just a little blonde, slutty American girl" when she rejected his sexual advances.

On October 17, 2020, a group of Patrick Henry College alumni released a public letter accusing Cawthorn of "sexually predatory behavior" while he was a student there for a little more than one semester, as well as of vandalism and lying. The letter originally had ten signatories but the number increased to over 150 alumni in less than a week. Cawthorn claimed that most of the signers did not know him personally and his campaign posted a response letter of support for him signed by six alumni, two of whom work for Cawthorn's campaign. Cawthorn's response letter implied support by former Patrick Henry College President Michael Farris; Farris disavowed the support letter and asked that he not be associated with it.

A February 2021 BuzzFeed News investigation found 20 people who said that Cawthorn had harassed his female classmates during college; the reporters spoke to four women who said he had harassed them. It was alleged that Cawthorn often recklessly drove women in his car to remote areas off campus while asking them sexual questions: he reportedly called these journeys "fun drives". Two resident assistants said they warned women to avoid Cawthorn and not to ride in his car. A male acquaintance said Cawthorn bragged about pulling a woman into his lap and putting a finger between her legs.

Circulation of nude video 
On May 4, 2022, a video began circulating online that showed Cawthorn naked in bed, thrusting his genitals toward another man's face while moaning. Cawthorn said of the video, "Years ago, in this video, I was being crass with a friend, trying to be funny. We were acting foolish, and joking. That's it." He called the video "blackmail" on Twitter after he had released an eight-minute video addressing it and other controversies.

Firearms at airports
In February 2021, Transportation Security Administration agents at the Asheville Regional Airport discovered an unloaded Glock 9mm handgun and loaded magazine in Cawthorn's carry-on bag. A spokesman for Cawthorn said the gun, magazine, and ammunition were meant to have been stowed in his checked luggage.

In April 2022, Cawthorn was briefly detained at an airport in Charlotte, North Carolina, for attempting to board a commercial flight with a loaded handgun in his carry-on luggage. Police said he was cooperative, and he was cited for possession of a dangerous weapon on city property. Cawthorn had a trial date in Mecklenburg County on January 13, 2023, for bringing the gun to the airport in Charlotte. The trial was delayed until May.

Driving offenses
In March 2022, Cawthorn was charged with driving while his license was revoked and while two speeding tickets were pending. He faces possible time in jail. A 2017 charge of driving on a revoked license was dismissed. Cawthorn had court dates in Polk and Cleveland counties in June 2022 for speeding and driving with a revoked license.

Insider trading 
In April 2022, Senator Thom Tillis called for an investigation into Cawthorn for possible violations of the STOCK Act, stating that Cawthorn's purchase of an anti-Biden "Let's Go Brandon" cryptocurrency without disclosure may have violated insider trading rules for members of Congress. By December 2022, it was reported that Cawthorn had violated the STOCK Act a total of three times that year for failing to disclose further tens of thousands of dollar sales in Let's Go Brandon coin.

Electoral history

2020

2022

References

External links

 
 
 

|-

|-

1995 births
Living people
21st-century American politicians
American Christians
American politicians with disabilities
Christians from North Carolina
Far-right politicians in the United States
Patrick Henry College people
People from Hendersonville, North Carolina
Politicians from Asheville, North Carolina
Politicians with paraplegia
Republican Party members of the United States House of Representatives from North Carolina
Wheelchair users